Huizum is a residential area of the municipality of Leeuwarden in the province of Friesland, Netherlands. It has approximately 9,000 inhabitants. Huizum was formerly part of Leeuwarderadeel and incorporates a former village.

Description
Huizum has three sections: Huizum-West, Huizum-Oost and Huizum-Dorp (Huizum West, Huizum East and Huizum Village). Huizum-West was developed in the early 20th century. The  section, built in 1914–1915, was designed by Willem Cornelis de Groot and in 2007 was declared a protected national monument in the category of villages and towns.

History
Huizum-Dorp was built on a terp, indicating that it was inhabited before the creation of dykes around 1000 CE. The first written record of the settlement is in a letter dated 1149 from Wibald, Abbot of Corvey to the Bishop of Utrecht. In addition to Huizum, which means "by the houses", a reference to stinsen or residences of the nobility once located there, it has in the past been known as Husma, Hwsmanghae and Husum.

Huizum was formerly the administrative centre of Leeuwarderadeel. On 1 January 1944, during the Nazi German occupation, the southern section of Leeuwarderadeel was transferred to Leeuwarden; the town hall remained in Huizum until 1965.

Notable people
Bert Bakker
Ted Meines
van Huysum family of painters

References

External links

Populated places in Friesland